Figitidae is a family of parasitoid wasps. The full diversity of this wasp family is not yet known, but about 1400 species have been described to over 130 genera. For example, the largest subfamily, Eucoilinae (previously considered as a separate family, the Eucoilidae), has over 1000 described species so far, but this is probably just a fraction of the total diversity. Figitid species occur throughout most of the world.

Some Figitidae are Drosophila parasitoids, such as the genera Leptopilina, Leptolamina, and Ganaspis.

Systematics
As of 2011, there are 12 subfamilies.

Anacharitinae
Aspicerinae
Charipinae
Emargininae
Euceroptrinae
Eucoilinae
Figitinae
Mikeiinae
Parnipinae
Plectocynipinae
Pycnostigminae
Thrasorinae

References

External links
Figitidae.  British Insects: the Families of Hymenoptera.
 BioLib: Figitidae taxa

Cynipoidea
Apocrita families